Alak is a language spoken by some 4,000 people in southern Laos, especially in the Provinces of Salavan and Sekong (where the Alak people make up over a fifth of the population).  It is closely related to the language spoken by the Bahnars of Vietnam. It includes two dialects, Alak proper and Harak.

References

External links 
 https://projekt.ht.lu.se/rwaai RWAAI (Repository and Workspace for Austroasiatic Intangible Heritage)
 http://hdl.handle.net/10050/00-0000-0000-0003-903B-B@view Alak in RWAAI Digital Archive

Bahnaric languages
Languages of Laos